Félix Saurí Vivas (December 1850 – 25 December 1915), also known as Félix Saurí y Vivas, was a Spanish-Puerto Rican businessman and interim Mayor of Ponce, from 13 May 1895 to 11 July 1895.

Career
Saurí Vivas was born in  Mataró in the Province of Barcelona to Pedro Saurí and Teresa Vivas. He immigrated to Puerto Rico, where he was a businessman and hacienda holder. He became mayor of Ponce in 1895. In the same year, he also founded, with Juan Serralles Banco Crédito y Ahorro Ponceño, one of the leading banking institutions in Puerto Rico for almost a century.

Casa Saurí

In 1882, Saurí Vivas built a two-story home, which later became known as Casa Saurí, in downtown Ponce, across from Plaza Muñoz Rivera, in today's Ponce Historic Zone. The house is said to be the third-oldest residence still standing in Ponce. It is located on the southwest corner of Calle Union and Calle Reina. In 1912, his home was used as the first site of Liceo Ponceño, Puerto Rico's first girls-only school.

After Liceo Ponceño vacated the home around the 1950s-1960s, the house was occupied for several years by various small businesses, including a travel agency and a toy store. Subsequently, it was vacant for several years. Then, in 2006-2009, the 1882 Casa Saurí was meticulously renovated and adapted as part of a new hotel, the Ponce Plaza Hotel & Casino, which opened in 2009. The hotel design included a four-story addition located next to the house, and a parking garage.

Legacy
In addition to leaving the majestic house in downtown Ponce as his legacy, mayor Félix Saurí Vivas is also honored at Ponce's Park of Illustrious Ponce Citizens. His remains are located in the Cementerio Católico de Ponce.

See also
Ponce, Puerto Rico
List of Puerto Ricans

References

Further reading
 Fay Fowlie de Flores. Ponce, Perla del Sur: Una Bibliográfica Anotada. Second Edition. 1997. Ponce, Puerto Rico: Universidad de Puerto Rico en Ponce. p. 110. Item 566. 
 Guillermo Atiles Garcia. Kaleidoscopio. Ponce, Puerto Rico: Establecimiento tipográfico de Manuel López. 1905. (Colegio Universitario Tecnológico de Ponce, CUTPO)

Mayors of Ponce, Puerto Rico
1850 births
1915 deaths
Burials at Cementerio Católico San Vicente de Paul
Spanish emigrants to Puerto Rico
People from Mataró